Rob Calloway (born July 18, 1969) is an American boxer. He had forty amateur bouts, was the Kansas City Golden Gloves champion three times, and a semifinalist for the 1992 US western Olympic trials. He has held the World Boxing Council Continental Americas cruiserweight title, International Boxing Federation International cruiserweight title, World Boxing Foundation heavyweight title, and the North American Boxing Association cruiserweight title. His win over Bob Mirovic in Australia for the World Boxing Foundation heavyweight championship was designated the 2005 Fight of the Year by Fox Sports (Australia).

Calloway has faced some of the world's most famous boxers including former heavyweight champion Hasim Rahman, who knocked out Calloway in two rounds. He and his wife Robin have two children, Chase ("Kid Dynamite") Calloway and Riley ("Butter").

Professional Boxing Record 

| align="center" style="border-style: none none solid solid; background: #e3e3e3"|Result
| align="center" style="border-style: none none solid solid; background: #e3e3e3"|Record
| align="center" style="border-style: none none solid solid; background: #e3e3e3"|Opponent
| align="center" style="border-style: none none solid solid; background: #e3e3e3"|Type
| align="center" style="border-style: none none solid solid; background: #e3e3e3"|Round
| align="center" style="border-style: none none solid solid; background: #e3e3e3"|Date
| align="center" style="border-style: none none solid solid; background: #e3e3e3"|Location
| align="center" style="border-style: none none solid solid; background: #e3e3e3"|Notes
|-align=center
|Loss
|
|align=left| Mark de Mori
|TKO
|4 
|17/03/2012
|align=left| Entertainment Centre, Gladstone, Queensland, Australia
|-align=center
|Win
|
|align=left| Galen Brown
|TKO
|4 
|04/11/2011
|align=left| Civic Arena, Saint Joseph, Missouri, United States
|align=left|
|-align=center
|Loss
|
|align=left| Chauncy Welliver
|UD
|12
|03/10/2011
|align=left| Tianjin, China
|align=left|
|-align=center
|Win
|
|align=left| Travis Fulton
|MD
|6
|06/08/2010
|align=left| Memorial Hall, Kansas City, Kansas, United States
|align=left|
|-align=center
|Loss
|
|align=left| Shannon Briggs
|TKO
|1 
|28/05/2010
|align=left| Norfolk Scope Arena, Norfolk, Virginia, United States
|align=left|
|-align=center
|Loss
|
|align=left| Paweł Kołodziej
|RTD
|6 
|18/12/2009
|align=left| MOSiR Hall, Ks. Skorupki 21, Łódź, Poland
|align=left|
|-align=center
|Win
|
|align=left| Clinton Boldridge
|TKO
|5 
|07/11/2009
|align=left| Civic Arena, Saint Joseph, Missouri, United States
|align=left|
|-align=center
|Loss
|
|align=left| Grigory Drozd
|TKO
|7 
|06/12/2008
|align=left| Circus, Nizhny Novgorod (Gorky), Russia
|align=left|
|-align=center
|Loss
|69-9-2
|align=left| Aleksandr Alekseyev
|TKO
|3 
|27/09/2008
|align=left| Color Line Arena, Altona, Hamburg, Germany
|align=left|
|-align=center
|style="background:#abcdef;"|Draw
|69-8-2
|align=left| Max Alexander
|PTS
|12
|19/07/2008
|align=left| Civic Arena, Saint Joseph, Missouri, United States
|align=left|
|-align=center
|Win
|69-8-1
|align=left| David Robinson
|TKO
|2 
|22/05/2008
|align=left| Viking Hotel Grand Ballroom, Saint Louis, Missouri, United States
|align=left|
|-align=center
|Win
|68-8-1
|align=left| Juan Carlos Robles
|TKO
|8 
|15/03/2008
|align=left| Days Inn, Allentown, Pennsylvania, United States
|align=left|
|-align=center
|Win
|67-8-1
|align=left| Matt Gockel
|TKO
|2 
|23/02/2008
|align=left| Civic Arena, Saint Joseph, Missouri, United States
|align=left|
|-align=center
|Win
|66-8-1
|align=left| Galen Brown
|TKO
|4 
|06/10/2007
|align=left| Civic Arena, Saint Joseph, Missouri, United States
|align=left|
|-align=center
|Win
|65-8-1
|align=left| Terry Smith
|UD
|10
|10/08/2007
|align=left| Expo Center, Springfield, Missouri, United States
|align=left|
|-align=center
|Win
|64-8-1
|align=left| Chris Thomas
|TKO
|3 
|30/05/2007
|align=left| Barney Allis Plaza, Kansas City, Missouri, United States
|align=left|
|-align=center
|Win
|63-8-1
|align=left| Cliff Couser
|TKO
|2 
|10/05/2007
|align=left| Crowne Plaza Hotel, Tulsa, Oklahoma, United States
|align=left|
|-align=center
|Win
|62-8-1
|align=left| Stacy Goodson
|TKO
|2 
|18/04/2007
|align=left| Clifford Park, Nassau, Bahamas
|align=left|
|-align=center
|Win
|61-8-1
|align=left| Tyrone Roberts
|TKO
|3 
|29/03/2007
|align=left| Harrah's Casino, Kansas City, Missouri, United States
|align=left|
|-align=center
|Win
|60-8-1
|align=left| Buck Smith
|TKO
|3 
|24/02/2007
|align=left| Civic Arena, Saint Joseph, Missouri, United States
|align=left|
|-align=center
|Win
|59-8-1
|align=left| Doug Kaluza
|KO
|2 
|07/12/2006
|align=left| Municipal Auditorium, Kansas City, Missouri, United States
|align=left|
|-align=center
|Win
|58-8-1
|align=left| Byron Polley
|TKO
|2 
|27/10/2006
|align=left| Civic Arena, Saint Joseph, Missouri, United States
|align=left|
|-align=center
|Win
|57-8-1
|align=left| David Robinson
|KO
|3 
|21/07/2006
|align=left| Bricktown, Oklahoma City, United States
|align=left|
|-align=center
|Loss
|56-8-1
|align=left| Jameel McCline
|UD
|10
|26/04/2006
|align=left| Buffalo Run Casino, Miami, Oklahoma, United States
|align=left|
|-align=center
|Win
|56-7-1
|align=left| Benito Fernandez
|KO
|1 
|18/03/2006
|align=left| Convention Center, Fort Smith, Arkansas, United States
|align=left|
|-align=center
|Loss
|55-7-1
|align=left| Ruslan Chagaev
|KO
|2 
|07/01/2006
|align=left| Zenith – Die Kulturhalle, Munich, Germany
|align=left|
|-align=center
|Win
|55-6-1
|align=left| Richard Tutaki
|TKO
|2 
|01/10/2005
|align=left| Civic Arena, Saint Joseph, Missouri, United States
|align=left|
|-align=center
|Win
|54-6-1
|align=left| Bob Mirovic
|UD
|12
|24/06/2005
|align=left| Royal Pines Resort, Ashmore, Gold Coast, Queensland, Australia
|align=left|
|-align=center
|Win
|53-6-1
|align=left| Jim Strohl
|TKO
|6 
|14/05/2005
|align=left| Delta Center, Salt Lake City, Australia
|align=left|
|-align=center
|Win
|52-6-1
|align=left| Daniel Frank
|KO
|1 
|04/03/2005
|align=left| Civic Arena, Saint Joseph, Missouri, United States
|align=left|
|-align=center
|Win
|51-6-1
|align=left| Travis Fulton
|TKO
|2 
|05/02/2005
|align=left| Diggz Arena, Omaha, Nebraska, United States
|align=left|
|-align=center
|Win
|50-6-1
|align=left| Kerry Biles
|TKO
|6 
|26/01/2005
|align=left| Ameristar Casino, Kansas City, Missouri, United States
|align=left|
|-align=center
|Win
|49-6-1
|align=left| Jeff Pegues
|KO
|2 
|03/12/2004
|align=left| Municipal Auditorium, Kansas City, Missouri, United States
|align=left|
|-align=center
|Win
|48-6-1
|align=left| Andy Sample
|TKO
|2 
|29/10/2004
|align=left| Civic Arena, Saint Joseph, Missouri, United States
|align=left|
|-align=center
|Win
|47-6-1
|align=left| Kerry Biles
|KO
|4 
|08/10/2004
|align=left| Lakeside Casino, Osceola, Iowa, United States
|align=left|
|-align=center
|Loss
|46-6-1
|align=left| Hasim Rahman
|KO
|2 
|17/06/2004
|align=left| Michael's Eighth Avenue, Glen Burnie, Maryland, United States
|align=left|
|-align=center
|Win
|46-5-1
|align=left| Jeff Ford
|KO
|2 
|26/05/2004
|align=left| Ameristar Casino, Kansas City, Missouri, United States
|align=left|
|-align=center
|Win
|45-5-1
|align=left| Daniel Salcedo
|KO
|2 
|12/03/2004
|align=left| Civic Arena, Saint Joseph, Missouri, United States
|align=left|
|-align=center
|Win
|44-5-1
|align=left| Jason Nicholson
|TKO
|3 
|27/12/2003
|align=left| Civic Arena, Saint Joseph, Missouri, United States
|align=left|
|-align=center
|Win
|43-5-1
|align=left| Julius Long
|UD
|12
|18/10/2003
|align=left| Civic Arena, Saint Joseph, Missouri, United States
|align=left|
|-align=center
|Loss
|42-5-1
|align=left| Audley Harrison
|TKO
|5 
|08/02/2003
|align=left| Fountain Leisure Centre, Brentford, London, United Kingdom
|align=left|
|-align=center
|style="background:#abcdef;"|Draw
|42-4-1
|align=left| Ruslan Chagaev
|TD
|3 
|05/10/2002
|align=left| Cobo Hall, Detroit, United States
|align=left|
|-align=center
|Win
|42–4
|align=left| Eric Davis
|TKO
|9 
|08/09/2002
|align=left| Ramada Inn, Saint Joseph, Missouri, United States
|align=left|
|-align=center
|Win
|41–4
|align=left| Otis Tisdale
|TKO
|11 
|28/06/2002
|align=left| Civic Arena, Saint Joseph, Missouri, United States
|align=left|
|-align=center
|Win
|40–4
|align=left| Marcus Rhode
|TKO
|3 
|26/04/2002
|align=left| Saint Joseph, Missouri, United States
|align=left|
|-align=center
|Loss
|39–4
|align=left| Tue Bjørn Thomsen
|UD
|12
|21/09/2001
|align=left| Idraettens hus, Vejle, Denmark
|align=left|
|-align=center
|Win
|39–3
|align=left| Craig Brinson
|TKO
|6 
|18/08/2001
|align=left| Fairmont Hotel, Dallas, United States
|align=left|
|-align=center
|Win
|38–3
|align=left| James Tillis
|TKO
|9 
|13/04/2001
|align=left| Civic Arena, Saint Joseph, Missouri, United States
|align=left|
|-align=center
|Win
|37–3
|align=left| Jason Nicholson
|TKO
|3 
|11/11/2000
|align=left| Civic Arena, Saint Joseph, Missouri, United States
|align=left|
|-align=center
|Win
|36–3
|align=left| Lorenzo Boyd
|TKO
|6 
|28/07/2000
|align=left| Civic Arena, Saint Joseph, Missouri, United States
|align=left|
|-align=center
|Win
|35–3
|align=left| Troy Weida
|TKO
|1 
|31/03/2000
|align=left| Catfish Bend Casino, Burlington, Iowa, United States
|align=left|
|-align=center
|Win
|34–3
|align=left| Dan Kosmicki
|TKO
|2 
|18/02/2000
|align=left| Burlington Auditorium, Burlington, Iowa, United States
|align=left|
|-align=center
|Loss
|33–3
|align=left| Kenny Keene
|UD
|12
|12/11/1999
|align=left| Bank of America Center, Boise, Idaho, United States
|align=left|
|-align=center
|Win
|33–2
|align=left| Donnie Penelton
|UD
|8
|01/09/1999
|align=left| St. Jo Frontier Casino, Saint Joseph, Missouri, United States
|align=left|
|-align=center
|style="background:#ddd;"|NC
|32–2
|align=left| Dan Kosmicki
|ND
|6 
|10/07/1999
|align=left| Civic Arena, Saint Joseph, Missouri, United States
|align=left|
|-align=center
|Win
|32–2
|align=left| Nathaniel Miles
|UD
|8
|23/05/1999
|align=left| Harrah's Casino, Kansas City, Missouri, United States
|align=left|
|-align=center
|Win
|31–2
|align=left| Darrell Spinks
|UD
|12
|03/04/1999
|align=left| Civic Arena, Saint Joseph, Missouri, United States
|align=left|
|-align=center
|style="background:#ddd;"|NC
|30–2
|align=left| Shawn Clarkson
|ND
|1 
|19/02/1999
|align=left| Memorial Auditorium, Burlington, Iowa, United States
|align=left|
|-align=center
|Win
|30–2
|align=left| John Moore
|TKO
|5 
|16/01/1999
|align=left| Horton, Kansas, United States
|align=left|
|-align=center
|Win
|29–2
|align=left| Dominick Carter
|TKO
|2 
|10/10/1998
|align=left| Civic Arena, Saint Joseph, Missouri, United States
|align=left|
|-align=center
|style="background:#ddd;"|NC
|28–2
|align=left| Jason Nicholson
|ND
|6
|30/09/1998
|align=left| Station Casino, Kansas City, Missouri, United States
|align=left|
|-align=center
|Win
|28–2
|align=left| Lonnie Knowles
|TKO
|3 
|10/07/1998
|align=left| Station Casino, Kansas City, Missouri, United States
|align=left|
|-align=center
|Win
|27–2
|align=left| Tyler Hughes
|KO
|8 
|19/05/1998
|align=left| Civic Arena, Saint Joseph, Missouri, United States
|align=left|
|-align=center
|Win
|26–2
|align=left| Mike Pearman
|TKO
|3 
|10/02/1998
|align=left| Civic Arena, Saint Joseph, Missouri, United States
|align=left|
|-align=center
|Win
|25–2
|align=left| Zennie Reynolds
|TKO
|3 
|12/12/1997
|align=left| North Iowa Fairground, Mason City, Iowa, United States
|align=left|
|-align=center
|Win
|24–2
|align=left| Richard Wilson
|TKO
|2 
|25/10/1997
|align=left| Civic Arena, Saint Joseph, Missouri, United States
|align=left|
|-align=center
|style="background:#ddd;"|NC
|23–2
|align=left| Daniel Salcedo
|ND
|3 
|09/10/1997
|align=left| Palace Theater, Altoona, Iowa, United States
|align=left|
|-align=center
|Win
|23–2
|align=left| Eric Davis
|UD
|8
|08/08/1997
|align=left| Station Casino, Kansas City, Missouri, United States
|align=left|
|-align=center
|Win
|22–2
|align=left| Tyrus Armstead
|TKO
|7 
|03/06/1997
|align=left| Station Casino, Kansas City, Missouri, United States
|align=left|
|-align=center
|Win
|21–2
|align=left| Ray Domenge
|TKO
|7 
|02/04/1997
|align=left| Station Casino, Kansas City, Missouri, United States
|align=left|
|-align=center
|Win
|20–2
|align=left| Danny Thomas
|UD
|12
|11/12/1996
|align=left| Fireman's Local 77, Saint Joseph, Missouri, United States
|align=left|
|-align=center
|Win
|19–2
|align=left| Steve Langley
|KO
|5 
|27/11/1996
|align=left| Beaumont Club, Kansas City, Missouri, United States
|align=left|
|-align=center
|Win
|18–2
|align=left| Richard Green
|TKO
|4 
|16/10/1996
|align=left| Beaumont Club, Kansas City, Missouri, United States
|align=left|
|-align=center
|Win
|17–2
|align=left| Joe Harris
|UD
|6
|13/09/1996
|align=left| Knapp Center, Des Moines, Iowa, United States
|align=left|
|-align=center
|Win
|16–2
|align=left| Richard Wilson
|UD
|6
|12/08/1996
|align=left| Beaumont Club, Kansas City, Missouri, United States
|align=left|
|-align=center
|Win
|15–2
|align=left| Larry Fleming
|TKO
|2 
|31/07/1996
|align=left| Prairie Meadows Casino, Altoona, Iowa, United States
|align=left|
|-align=center
|Win
|14–2
|align=left| Frank Minton
|KO
|3 
|03/06/1996
|align=left| Marriott Allis Plaza Hotel, Kansas City, Missouri, United States
|align=left|
|-align=center
|Win
|13–2
|align=left| Zennie Reynolds
|TKO
|5 
|24/04/1996
|align=left| Fireman's Local 77, Saint Joseph, Missouri, United States
|align=left|
|-align=center
|Win
|12–2
|align=left| Randy McGaugh
|TKO
|5 
|15/01/1996
|align=left| Beaumont Club, Kansas City, Missouri, United States
|align=left|
|-align=center
|Win
|11–2
|align=left| Vance Winn
|UD
|6
|26/08/1995
|align=left| Argosy Riverboat, Kansas City, Missouri, United States
|align=left|
|-align=center
|Win
|10–2
|align=left| Carlos Vásquez
|TKO
|3 
|11/05/1995
|align=left| Marriott Allis Plaza Hotel, Kansas City, Missouri, United States
|align=left|
|-align=center
|Win
|9–2
|align=left| Kevin Cloughlay
|TKO
|4 
|13/02/1995
|align=left| Marriott Allis Plaza Hotel, Kansas City, Missouri, United States
|align=left|
|-align=center
|Loss
|8–2
|align=left| Roman Santos
|PTS
|5
|25/08/1994
|align=left| Las Vegas, United States
|align=left|
|-align=center
|Win
|8–1
|align=left| Carlos Vásquez
|TKO
|5 
|25/05/1994
|align=left| Civic Arena, Saint Joseph, Missouri, United States
|align=left|
|-align=center
|Win
|7–1
|align=left| Derrick Edwards
|TKO
|2 
|21/04/1994
|align=left| Las Vegas, United States
|align=left|
|-align=center
|Win
|6–1
|align=left| Willie Jackson
|KO
|1 
|10/02/1994
|align=left| Saint Joseph, Missouri, United States
|align=left|
|-align=center
|Loss
|5–1
|align=left| Ken McCurdy
|SD
|6
|23/10/1993
|align=left| Civic Arena, Saint Joseph, Missouri, United States
|align=left|
|-align=center
|Win
|5–0
|align=left| Larry McFadden
|KO
|1 
|23/08/1993
|align=left| Civic Arena, Saint Joseph, Missouri, United States
|align=left|
|-align=center
|Win
|4–0
|align=left| Rodney Coe
|PTS
|4
|25/06/1993
|align=left| St. Louis, Missouri, United States
|align=left|
|-align=center
|Win
|3–0
|align=left| Aaron Platt
|KO
|1 
|25/06/1993
|align=left| St. Louis, Missouri, United States
|align=left|
|-align=center
|Win
|2–0
|align=left| Ron Jackson
|KO
|1 
|17/01/1993
|align=left| Hyatt Regency Ballroom, St. Louis, Missouri, United States
|align=left|
|-align=center
|Win
|1–0
|align=left| Kenny Brown
|PTS
|4
|24/10/1992
|align=left| Wichita, Kansas, United States
|align=left|
|-align=center

References

External links
 
 Calloway's website

1969 births
Living people
Boxers from Kentucky
People from Hartford, Kentucky
American male boxers
Cruiserweight boxers